Sofía Maccari is an Argentine field hockey player. At the 2012 Summer Olympics, she competed for the Argentina women's national field hockey team in the women's event and won the silver medal. Sofía has also won the Champions Trophy in 2012 and the silver medal at the 2011 Pan American Games

Hockey career
Maccari was called out to join the national team by Carlos Retegui in 2010. Since then, she played every major tournament until her dismissal in 2013 by Emanuel Roggero due to squad issues. 
In October 2020, with Retegui back as a head coach, Maccari was called back to the national team after 7 years out.

References

External links 
 

Living people
Field hockey players from Buenos Aires
Argentine female field hockey players
Olympic field hockey players of Argentina
Field hockey players at the 2012 Summer Olympics
Olympic medalists in field hockey
Las Leonas players
Olympic silver medalists for Argentina
Argentine people of Italian descent
1984 births
Medalists at the 2012 Summer Olympics
Pan American Games silver medalists for Argentina
Pan American Games medalists in field hockey
Atlètic Terrassa players
Field hockey players at the 2011 Pan American Games
Medalists at the 2011 Pan American Games
Medalists at the 2020 Summer Olympics
Field hockey players at the 2020 Summer Olympics
21st-century Argentine women